Black kashk or Qarehqurut (Persian: قره‌قوروت یا سیاه‌کشک), is a milky product which is produced in Iran, Afghanistan, Tajikistan and some of the central asian countries. it's usually in color of blacks, white, brown or yellow and tastes sour, another common name for it, is Qara (Persian: قارا)

Preparation
Black kashk is fabricated from the liquid yoghurt. After removing the fat of the yoghurt, the remaining liquid is boiled to be concentrated. In the next step, the produced liquid will elutriate. The concentrated solid material is called Kashk, which can be used in several Iranian dishes such as āsh. The liquid left from the concentrating process will be boiled and dried to produce black Kashk.

References
Persian Wikipedia

Fermented dairy products